Rhexia virginica, the handsome Harry or Virginia meadow-beauty, is a species of flowering plant in the family Melastomataceae. It is native to much of eastern North America, and is often found in moist, often acidic soils in open areas.

This species is a perennial herb that is easily identified by its distinctly angled stems. It produces purple-pink flowers in the summer that use buzz pollination for reproduction.

Gallery

References

virginica
Flora of North America
Plants described in 1753
Taxa named by Carl Linnaeus